Parachi (Parāčī) is an Iranian language. Parachi is spoken by some 600 individuals of the Parachi ethnic group in eastern Afghanistan, mainly in the upper part of Nijrab District, northeast of Kabul, out of a total ethnic Parachi population of some 5,000.

It is closely related to the Ormuri language of Kaniguram in South Waziristan, Pakistan. Parachi is usually classified as a member of the Southeastern group of the Eastern Iranian languages, although this is an areal group rather than a genetical one.

References

Further reading 

 .
 .

Languages of Afghanistan
Eastern Iranian languages